
Gmina Kłoczew is a rural gmina (administrative district) in Ryki County, Lublin Voivodeship, in eastern Poland.

Villages
Gmina Kłoczew contains the villages and settlements of Borucicha, Bramka, Czernic, Gęsia Wólka, Gozd, Huta Zadybska, Jagodne, Janopol, Julianów, Kąty, Kawęczyn, Kłoczew, Kokoszka, Kurzelaty, Nowe Zadybie, Padarz, Przykwa, Rybaki, Rzyczyna, Sokola, Sosnówka, Stare Zadybie, Stryj, Wola Zadybska, Wola Zadybska-Kolonia, Wygranka, Wylezin and Zaryte.

Neighbouring gminas
Gmina Kłoczew is bordered by the gminas of Krzywda, Nowodwór, Ryki, Trojanów, Wola Mysłowska and Żelechów.

References
Polish official population figures 2006

Kloczew
Ryki County